The Delaware Library Association (DLA) is a professional organization for Delaware's librarians and library workers. It is headquartered in Dover, Delaware and is an all-volunteer organization. It was founded on January 18, 1934, the second-to-last US state to form a state library association. Its first president was Arthur Bailey.

Divisions
There are four divisions within the DLA.
 College & Research Libraries Division (CRLD)
 Delaware Association of School Librarians (DASL) - joined DLA in 1980
 Public Library Division (PLD)
 Youth Services Division (YSD) - give out the Blue Hen Book Award

References

External links
 Delaware Library Association website

Library associations in the United States
Organizations based in Delaware
1934 establishments in Delaware